Lionel Dyke "Pete" Parker (September 7, 1895 – February 11, 1991) was a Canadian radio announcer. He was one of the first people to ever broadcast ice hockey. He served overseas in World War I from 1916 to 1919.

Career
On March 14, 1923, Parker made the world's first complete play-by-play radio broadcast of a professional ice hockey game. The broadcast was carried by CKCK Radio in Regina, Saskatchewan. The game, held at Exhibition Park in Regina between the Regina Capitals and the Edmonton Eskimos, was a meeting of two Western Canada Professional Hockey League teams. Edmonton beat Regina, 1–0. This broadcast was officially recognized by Canada's Sports Hall of Fame in 1972. This followed by one month the Norman Albert broadcast on February 8, 1923, of the third period of a game between Midland and North Toronto of the Ontario Hockey Association. The first-ever full-game radio broadcast was made of a February 22, 1923 game between the Winnipeg Falcons and Port Arthur by Winnipeg radio station CJCG (owned by the Manitoba Free Press).

For many years, it was thought that Parker's broadcast preceded by 8 days the March 22, 1923 first broadcast by Hockey Night in Canada's Foster Hewitt. Hewitt's own biography lists the date of his first hockey broadcast as March 22. However, on March 22, there was no game at Toronto's Arena Gardens to call. Hewitt's first broadcast (of the third period only) may have been on February 16, 1923, for a game between Toronto and Kitchener.

References

1895 births
1991 deaths
Canadian military personnel of World War I
Canadian radio sportscasters